Hans Ulf Brunnberg (born 7 April 1947) is a Swedish actor.

Filmography

Film

Television

References

External links 

1947 births
Living people
Male actors from Stockholm
Swedish male film actors
Best Supporting Actor Guldbagge Award winners